John Williamson Legge (3 April 1917 – 29 October 1996), was an Australian scientist and activist.

History
Legge was born at 18 Beaver Street, East Malvern, Victoria the only son of (Congregationalist) Rev. G(eorge) A(lexander) Williamson Legge (1871 – 22 March 1931) and his wife Florence Legge, née Laver.

He was educated at Geelong College and the University of Melbourne. The year of his graduating BSc is not known, but he completed 3rd year Chemistry in 1935.

He moved to Sydney to work under Dr "Rudi" Lemberg at the Kolling Institute of Medical Research under a grant from the National Health and Medical Research Council (NH&MRC) studying blood pigment metabolism.
By 1939 he was thinking seriously about air-raid precautions, including gas attacks on civilians.

From 1942 to 1946 Legge worked with the Australian Chemical Warfare Research & Experimental Section on research into protective clothing and other aspects of defence against chemical warfare attacks in tropical conditions, including mustard gas trials at Townsville, North Brook Island, Proserpine and Mission Beach, involving Australian Defence Force volunteers. Legge and a fellow biochemist (later Prof. Sir) Hugh Ennor designed and oversaw the construction of a  stainless-steel temperature-controlled gas chamber. In later life he supported claims for compensation by those volunteers who suffered chronic illness that may been a result of those trials. The 1989 film Keen as Mustard documented these events.

In 1946 he was contributing articles on science for the Tribune.

Legge was granted a fellowship which enabled him to spend two years in England, working at the Molteno Institute, Cambridge University under Professor David Keilin. On returning to Australia he was employed by the University of Melbourne as a biochemistry lecturer, later senior lecturer, retiring around 1981.

Politics, science and pacifism
Legge joined the Communist Party in 1936 and helped distribute the Tribune at a time when the paper was banned.

He was, in September 1949, a charter member of the Australian Peace Council.

He wrote for the magazine Australian Left Review:
; and

Family 
Legge married Gertrude Guiterman on 29 June 1940. They had a son, John Michael Legge, on 9 January 1942.

References 

1917 births
1996 deaths
Australian pacifists
Australian biochemists
Academic staff of the University of Melbourne
Australian communists
People from Malvern, Victoria
Scientists from Melbourne
Activists from Melbourne
University of Melbourne alumni
People educated at Geelong College